Piet de Visser (born 23 September 1934) is a Dutch football manager and scout. He is best known for scouting players like Ronaldo and successfully bringing them to Europe. He is currently a personal adviser to Roman Abramovich, the former owner of English Premier League club Chelsea.

Career

Manager
After a career as a player for De Zeeuwen, RCH and Zeeland Sport, De Visser became involved in management. In 1957, he started as a youth and assistant manager at Sparta Rotterdam.

In 1964, he took his first assignment as a head manager at DFC and became champion of the second division in his first year. In 1973, while manager of De Graafschap, he and his club (which included defender Guus Hiddink) were promoted to the Eredivisie. He subsequently became champion of the Eerste Divisie with NEC in 1975, and moved to the Molenbeek which had won the Belgian League the preceding season.

He ended his management career in 1993, while at NAC Breda, due to heart problems. He has since struggled with his health, beating cancer and undergoing five bypass surgeries. During his career, De Visser managed Sparta, DFC, Telstar, De Graafschap, NEC, R.W.D. Molenbeek, FC Den Haag, Roda JC, AZ, Willem II and NAC Breda.

PSV
After his career as a manager, De Visser became scout at PSV, where he was responsible for scouting players like Ronaldo, Alex, Jefferson Farfán, Heurelho Gomes and Balázs Dzsudzsák for the club. He even scouted Adriano, but PSV coach Erik Gerets was not interested in signing the Brazilian.

Chelsea and Roman Abramovich
Since 2005, De Visser also scouts for Chelsea and is considered a close personal adviser on transfers to club owner Roman Abramovich. In one of his first scouting assignments for Chelsea, De Visser was responsible for the transfer of Arjen Robben from PSV to Chelsea. Guus Hiddink, who played under De Visser at De Graafschap and who worked with him at PSV, was recommended to Abramovich for the position of manager of the Russia national team. De Visser also recommended the hiring of Frank Arnesen to Abramovich, a move which was opposed by then Chelsea manager José Mourinho. It was also De Visser who first recommended the signing of Mikel John Obi and Salomon Kalou to Frank Arnesen for Chelsea. De Visser and Arnesen later clashed with former Chelsea manager Mourinho over transfer policy, with the two allegedly recommending Alex be brought over from PSV to solve the club's defensive problems, while Mourinho was said to have preferred Khalid Boulahrouz instead.

De Visser has also been instrumental in assisting Abramovich in setting up a youth academy at Chelsea, modelled on the academy at PSV. According to De Visser, "Mr Abramovich is fed up that he has to keep paying millions and millions for big star players. He had to pay an absolute fortune to get players like Didier Drogba and Michael Essien. This is why he has asked me as a private scout to look out for top class young players who will be the Chelsea stars in three years time."

De Visser was also instrumental in the February 2009 termination of Chelsea manager Luiz Felipe Scolari and the subsequent installment of Guus Hiddink. According to De Visser, he alerted Abramovich of Scolari's lacklustre training methods: "I had to watch training sessions he was giving to the squad. I died of shock. It was so weak, his training sessions lacked every kind of sharpness. It made the entire squad lack sharpness in matches. I did not need a lot of time to conclude things were really bad with Chelsea."

Honours
De Visser won the Dutch Second Division in his time as a manager. In 2005, he received the prestigious Rinus Michels Award for his entire oeuvre. The award is named after Rinus Michels, who was named coach of the century by FIFA in 1999.

Criticism of manipulative agents
De Visser has been openly critical of what he perceives as the manipulation of young players by player agents. He has said, "I want the player to get a good contract, and also that the football association and the club where the boy comes from gets a decent compensation. I would like to climb to the top of Mount Kilimanjaro and shout across the continent, 'Boys watch out for shady agents!''"

References

External links

1934 births
Living people
Dutch football managers
De Graafschap managers
Willem II (football club) managers
PSV Eindhoven
Chelsea F.C. non-playing staff
ADO Den Haag managers
Roda JC Kerkrade managers
NEC Nijmegen managers
R.W.D. Molenbeek managers
NAC Breda managers
FC Dordrecht managers
AZ Alkmaar managers
SC Telstar managers
Sportspeople from Vlissingen
Rinus Michels Award winners
Willem II (football club) non-playing staff